Li Wei the Magistrate, also known as Li Wei Becomes an Official, is a 2001 Chinese television historical comedy-drama starring Xu Zheng as a young Li Wei, an illiterate county magistrate who would become one of the most prominent officials during 18th-century Qing dynasty.

A great commercial success, the series was followed by a 2004 sequel Li Wei the Magistrate II, also starring Xu, and a 2005 sequel Li Wei Resigns from Office, starring Paul Chun as an older Li. The trilogy takes place during the reigns of the Kangxi Emperor, Yongzheng Emperor, and Qianlong Emperor respectively.

Production and broadcasts
The drama is usually considered the sidequel of the 1997 epic TV series Yongzheng Dynasty, returning most of its main cast in their iconic roles. However, whereas Yongzheng Dynasty is mostly based on history, Li Wei the Magistrate is almost completely fictional and includes a significant amount of comedy.

Filming began in October 2000 in Beijing. The series was first broadcast in Taiwan in August 2001. In mainland China, copyrights were sold to many TV stations, which began broadcasting it variously from September 2001 to 2002.

 Taiwan - Sanlih E-Television — August 2001
 China - Tianjin Television — September 2001
 Hong Kong - Asia Television — January 2002

During the series' run in Beijing, Xu Zheng began to be known as "Rookie Comedy King" (喜剧新人王). In Taiwan, he was given the nickname "mainland China's Dicky Cheung". Lead actress Chen Hao, then still a college student and relative unknown, saw her popularity skyrocket with the drama's airing.

Cast and characters
Xu Zheng as Li Wei
Chen Hao as Yue Siying
Tang Guoqiang as  Yinzhen (the future Yongzheng Emperor)
Jiao Huang as Kangxi Emperor
Xu Min as Yinreng
Wang Huichun as Yinsi
Wang Hui as Yinxiang
Du Zhiguo as Nian Gengyao
Li Xiaoyan as Li Wei's mother
Yang Haofei as Yue Xiaoman
Sun Baoguang as Feng Yueqing
Li Yi as Ren Nanpo
Wen Bo as Gu Pan'er
Li Qian as Shiliu

References

External links
Opening Theme on YouTube

2001 Chinese television series debuts
2001 Chinese television series endings
Television series set in the Qing dynasty
Mandarin-language television shows
Chinese historical television series
Chinese comedy-drama television series